Supravee Miprathang (born July 19, 1996), is a Thai professional footballer who plays as a left back for Thai League 1 club Ratchaburi Mitr Phol.

International career

He won the 2011 AFF U-16 Youth Championship with Thailand U17

International goals

Under-16

Under-19

Honours

International
Thailand U-17
 AFF U-16 Youth Championship: 2011

References

External links
 Profile at Goal
https://us.soccerway.com/players/supravee-miprathang/349907/

1996 births
Living people
Supravee Miprathang
Supravee Miprathang
Supravee Miprathang
Association football fullbacks
Supravee Miprathang
Supravee Miprathang
Supravee Miprathang
Supravee Miprathang
Supravee Miprathang
Supravee Miprathang